Sinta (or ) is a village in the Famagusta District of Cyprus. It is under the de facto control of Northern Cyprus. The village was recorded as early as the early 13th century in papal documents.

References 

Communities in Famagusta District
Populated places in Gazimağusa District
Municipalities of Northern Cyprus